The Anglican Church of St Peter at Windrush in the Cotswold District of Gloucestershire, England was built in the 12th century. It is a grade I listed building.

History

The church was built in the 12th century as a chapel of Great Barrington, and belonged to Llanthony Priory. The south transept was added in the 14th century.

A Victorian restoration by Henry Woodyer between 1874 and 1876 included the addition of the organ chamber and a vestry.

In 2015 the south doorway was cleaned and given protection against further decay.

The parish is part of the Windrush benefice within the Diocese of Gloucester.

Architecture

The limestone building has stone slate roofs. It consists of a three-bay nave with a south aisle and transept, a chancel with a vestry and an organ chamber.

The three-stage tower has six bells, five of them date from 1707 and were cast by Rudhall of Gloucester.

The surround of the south doorway is Norman with a double row of "beakheads" each slightly different and representing demons and a saw-tooth pattern decoration on the outside. The doorway has two mass dials.

The octagonal font was carved in the 15th century and the pulpit is Jacobean.

References

Church of England church buildings in Gloucestershire
Grade I listed churches in Gloucestershire
Cotswold District